Tamar Adar (24 July 1939 – 6 December 2008) was an Israeli writer, poet, playwright, and screenwriter. Adar has written screenplays for several popular Israeli television series and has published tens of popular children's books, as well as various other works. She has been the recipient of the Ministry of Education's Ze'ev Prize for Youth and Child Literature and other awards.

References

External links 
 Official site

1939 births
2008 deaths
Israeli Jews
Israeli children's writers
Israeli novelists
Modern Hebrew writers
Jews in Mandatory Palestine
Hebrew-language writers
Israeli women children's writers
Israeli women novelists